In music, Op. 315 stands for Opus number 315. Compositions that are assigned this number include:

 Davies – Symphony No. 9
 Strauss – Lob der Frauen